KOOR (1010 AM, branded as "Urbana 1010") is an American radio station licensed to serve the community Milwaukie, Oregon, United States. The station is currently owned by Bustos Media and the broadcast license is held by Bustos Media Holdings, LLC.

History
The station was assigned the call sign "KRKX" on August 22, 1983. On February 28, 1988, the station changed its call sign to "KZRC".
While having this callsign, it was affiliated with the radio network Z Rock, which played hard rock and heavy metal. It would remain affiliated with Z Rock until 1994. From 1994 to 1999, its call sign was KXYQ, which featured a talk format (politics and sports) until mid-1998 and country oldies for about a year thereafter. On August 13, 1999, it changed again to "KGUY" (sports and pop-culture talk), and on March 15, 2004, to KZNY. On May 16, 2006, the calls became "KSZN" and on January 18, 2007, to "KMUZ". On February 1, 2008, the calls became the current "KOOR".

In June 2010, owner Bustos Media (through its license-holding subsidiary Bustos Media of Oregon License, LLC) reached an agreement to transfer KOOR and several sister stations to Adelante Media subsidiary Adelante Media of Oregon License, LLC. The FCC approved the deal on September 3, 2010, and the transaction was consummated on September 24, 2010.

In August 2010, KOOR began airing Russian language programming under the brand "Russian Radio 7". The station previously broadcast a Spanish-language talk radio format branded as "W Radio 1010 AM".

In June 2011, Adelante Media sold KOOR and three Portland, Oregon, area sister stations back to Bustos Media (through its license-holding subsidiary Bustos Media Holdings, LLC) for a combined sale price of $1,260,000. The FCC approved the transfer on August 16, 2011, and the deal was formally consummated on September 30, 2011.

In November 2016, KOOR rebranded as "Наше Радио USA". However, as of February 2021, the station has reverted to a Spanish hits format, calling itself "Diez-diez AM", and imaging with the English phrase, "To The Max!".

On April 5, 2021, KOOR flipped to Spanish rhythmic top 40, branded as "Urbana", simulcasting on KXXP (104.5 FM).

On June 21, 2021, KOOR changed its format from a simulcast of Spanish rhythmic top 40-formatted KXXP 104.5 FM to Spanish sports, branded as "TUDN Deportes 1010".

In June 2022, former sister station KXXP (now KPLP) was sold by Jackman Holding Company, LLC to Walla Walla University, ending the LMA that Bustos Media was in. Due to this, KOOR shifted back to Spanish Rhythmic Top 40.

References

External links
Bustos Media, LLC

OOR
Radio stations established in 1988
Spanish-language radio stations in Oregon
Milwaukie, Oregon
1983 establishments in Oregon
OOR
OOR